Fight Back was the second 7-inch EP from hardcore punk group Discharge. It was produced by Mike Stone and was released in 1980, catalogue number Clay 3.

Track listing
"Fight Back"
"War’s No Fairytale"
"Always Restrictions"
"You Take Part in Creating This System"
"Religion Instigates"

Discharge (band) EPs
1980 EPs
Albums produced by Mike "Clay" Stone